The Workers' Youth League (or AUF) is Norway's largest political youth organization and is affiliated with the Norwegian Labour Party.

History
In 1903, the Norwegian Social-Democratic Youth League was formed, which the organization and historians consider to be the foundation of the organization.

As an organizational entity, AUF took its current form in April 1927 following the merger of Left Communist Youth League and Socialist Youth League of Norway corresponding with the merger of its parent parties after the conclusion of disputes over the "Twenty-one Conditions". Its ideology is social democracy and democratic socialism.

The chancellor of Germany and Nobel Peace Prize laureate Willy Brandt was a member of AUF after he fled from the Nazis in 1933 and found exile in Norway.

In 1958, the local chapter of Berge Furre and Kåre Sollund, Sosialistisk Studentlag, was closed down. A conflict arose after the United States had been offering its NATO allies American nuclear weapons as a defence against the Eastern Bloc. Sosialistisk Studenlag opposed this and as an attempt to prevent West Germany from getting access to nuclear weapons it contacted MPs during the Easter break to sign a petition. More than half of Labour's MPs signed in what is known as the Easter Rebellion of the Labour Party. The rebellion was badly received by the party leadership when the Easter break ended. Several people were excluded from the Labour Party, including the members of Sosialistisk Studentlag. All the MPs who signed the petition were later offered by the party to retract their signatures, which all but one of them did.

Three years later, Furre was one of the founders of Sosialistisk Folkeparti, which got two seats in the parliament after the 1961 election. Labour, who had been winning the majority of the seats in every election after World War II, got just 74 out of 150. No party has won the majority of the seats after this.

In 1998, the Workers' Youth League membership scandal resulted in two former treasurers and two former leaders of the Oslo chapter being found guilty of fraud, and given prison sentences for having unlawfully received NOK 648,000 in grants from the City of Oslo between 1992 and 1994—Ragnar Bøe Elgsaas, Anders Hornslien, Bjørn Jarle Rødberg Larsen and Anders Greif Mathisen.

On 22 July 2011, AUF's traditional summer camp on the island of Utøya was the scene of a massacre carried out by the right-wing extremist terrorist Anders Behring Breivik dressed as a police officer. He shot and killed 69 people (8 more in a previous bombing in Oslo), most of whom were members of AUF, and wounded several others.

Three prime ministers, Trygve Bratteli, Thorbjørn Jagland, and Jens Stoltenberg have been leaders in AUF. In addition, Oddvar Norli was leader of local chapter of Hedmark AUF and Gro Harlem Brundtland was deputy leader of Sosialistisk Studentlag and Arbeiderpartiets Studentlag, local chapters of AUF, before they both served as prime ministers.

Organisational structure 
Its current leader is Astrid Willa Eide Hoem which succeeded Ina Libak in October 2020. AUF employs county secretaries in all 19 counties of Norway.

Its central office is situated at the historical seat of the Norwegian labour movement, Youngstorget in Oslo, in the Peoples' Theatre building. At the main office the elected leadership work together with different political advisors with national campaigns, organisation and political issues. It is co-located with the offices of the Oslo and Akershus county wards.

The National Congress assembles every second year, and is the supreme body of the Workers' Youth League. The Congress will also elect the party leadership, consisting of a leader, a deputy leader and a secretary general. These three together with 14 other elected members constitutes the Executive Board. On a day-to-day basis AUF is governed by the Executive Board. The highest body between the Congress is the National Delegate's Board, consisting of two representatives from each of the 19 counties and is observed by the Executive Board.

The party magazine is Praksis, with roots back to 1923.

The organization is a full member of the International Union of Socialist Youth (IUSY) and the Joint Committee of the Nordic Labour Youth Movement (FNSU). AUF is also an observer member of the Young European Socialists (YES).

Leadership  

Leaders
2020–present: Astrid Eide Hoem
2018–2020: Ina Libak
2014–2018: Mani Hussaini
2010–2014: Eskil Pedersen
2006–2010: Martin Henriksen
2002–2006: Gry Larsen
2000–2002: Eva Kristin Hansen
1996–2000: Anniken Huitfeldt
1992–1996: Trond Giske
1989–1992: Turid Birkeland
1985–1989: Jens Stoltenberg
1981–1985: Egil Knudsen
1977–1981: Thorbjørn Jagland
1975–1977: Sissel Rønbeck
1973–1975: Rune Gerhardsen
1971–1973: Bjørn Tore Godal
1969–1971: Hans Raastad
1964–1969: Ola Teigen
1961–1964: Reiulf Steen
1958–1961: Bjartmar Gjerde
1955–1958: Reidar Hirsti
1952–1955: Ivar Mathiesen
1949–1952: Frank Andersen
1946–1949: Rolf Åkervik
1945–1946: Trygve Bratteli (acting)
1934–1945: Gunnar Sand (partly in exile)
1931–1934: Kåre Hansen
1927–1931: Hjalmar Dyrendahl

Deputy leaders
2020–present: Gaute Børstad Skjervø
2018–2020: Astrid Eide Hoem
2016–2018: Ina Libak
2014–2016: Emilie Bersaas
2010–2014: Åsmund Aukrust
2006–2010: Eskil Pedersen
2004-2006: Martin Henriksen
2002–2004: Eirik Øwre Thorshaug
2000–2002: Gry Larsen
1996–2000: Jo Stein Moen
1994–1996: Anniken Huitfeldt
1992–1994: Beret Bråten
1989–1992: Geir Axelsen
1987–1989: Turid Birkeland
1985–1987: Grete Berget
1983–1985: Jens Stoltenberg
1981–1983: Norvald Mo
1977–1981: Anne-Lise Bakken
1975–1977: Sigbjørn Johnsen
1973–1975: Sissel Rønbeck
1969–1973: Rolv Lasse Lund
1967–1969: Britt Hildeng
1964–1967: Kurt Mosbakk
1961–1964: Sverre Gullikstad
1958–1961: Bjørn Skau
1955–1958: Bjørn Sørensen
1952–1955: Reidar Hirsti
1949–1952: Bjarne Andersen
1946–1949: Erling Nordberg
1937–1946: Rakel Seweriin (not in exile)
1934–1937: Finn Moe
1931–1934: Per Lie
1927–1931: Arne Strøm

See also 
 Framfylkingen

References

External links 
  

Youth wings of political parties in Norway
Youth wings of social democratic parties
Labour Party (Norway)
1927 establishments in Norway
Youth organizations established in 1927
Organisations based in Oslo